Danielle April (born July 1, 1949) is a Canadian artist working in the fields of painting, sculpture, photography, installation art, printmaking and drawing. April's work often explores time and memory.

Life and work
Danielle April was born on July 1, 1949 in Rivière-du-Loup, Quebec. April studied art at the École des beaux-arts de Québec, graduating in 1971, followed by earning a bachelor's degree in visual arts at the Université Laval in 1972. 
She lives and works in Quebec City. Time and memory are common themes in April's artwork. In 2002, April received the Prix d’excellence de la Culture Videre from the Québec City.

Permanent collections
Attente illusoire III, 1983, mixed media, Musée national des beaux-arts du Québec
Precarious Balance, 2009, sculpture, Citizen's Park, Baie-Saint-Paul, Quebec

References

1947 births
21st-century Canadian painters
21st-century Canadian photographers
21st-century Canadian sculptors
21st-century Canadian women artists
Artists from Quebec
Canadian illustrators
Canadian installation artists
Women installation artists
Canadian women painters
Living people
People from Rivière-du-Loup
Université Laval alumni